Firewing is a children's book written by the Canadian author, Kenneth Oppel. It is the third book in the series which also consists of: Silverwing, Sunwing and the prequel, Darkwing.

Plot
Griffin Silverwing is the son of Shade Silverwing and Marina Brightwing. Slower and more clumsy than non-hybrids, Griffin's only real friend is Luna, a popular newborn. Fearing rejection by his father, Griffin steals fire from human campers to show his bravery. Unfortunately, Luna is accidentally set on fire. Guilt-stricken, Griffin flies into the lower levels of Tree Haven and discovers a crack that leads to the underworld. An earthquake opens the crack up wider and Griffin is sucked into the Underworld, unknown to the Silverwing colony. When Shade is unable to find his son, the Elders give him two days to search the Underworld before promising to seal the crack again.

There, Griffin discovers a colony of bats that are unaware that they are dead. The bats are wary of Griffin because, as he is still alive, he appears to glow to them. Griffin discovers that the recently deceased Luna has become a member of the colony and has no memory of him. Fortunately, a group of Pilgrims (bats who realize they are dead) arrive and rekindle Luna's memory of Griffin. The Pilgrim, Frieda, tells them about a gigantic, incandescent Tree, which supposedly sends dead bats that enter it to another, more enjoyable afterlife. Frieda believes that the Tree will send Griffin back home, as he is alive. Armed with Frieda's sound map, Griffin and Luna head out to find the Tree.

Meanwhile, Goth awakens in the underworld and discovers that he is dead. After members of his own species try to capture him and subject him to slave labour, Goth demands an explanation from Zotz. Zotz appears and explains that Goth is to be tortured because of his failure to free Zotz during the last eclipse. Goth bargains for a way to regain Zotz' trust. Since Zotz cannot harm the living, he tells Goth that he will be given a second chance at life if he kills Griffin.

With both Shade and Goth trying to find Griffin, Goth catches up first. However, the still-living Griffin is stronger than Goth and able to fight him off. Griffin and Luna enter a cavern, which has the power to mesmerize dead bats by reminding them of their past lives. Shade manages to find Griffin and Luna there, but Goth arrives for a second time. Griffin and Luna escape, but Shade becomes lost in the cavern river and Goth's every bone is broken in the struggle.

Griffin and Luna discover a bat named Dante in a group of bats who fear nothing because, as they say, "with death, your fears also go". They explain that they have chosen to spend eternity contemplating philosophy, rather than entering the Tree. Griffin, not wanting to go on because of his injury, gets into an argument with Luna. Out of guilt, he admits to being the reason for Luna's death, but regains his desire to find the Tree in the ensuing struggle. Shade, having escaped from the river, is lured into a trap by Zotz. He mutilates Goth's ear, effectively blinding his echolocation. Zotz is able to give Goth the likeness of Shade and taunts the real Shade with a story about how the underworld and the Tree came to be.

Griffin and Luna reach the Tree, but before they can enter it, Goth arrives disguised as Shade. Goth kills Griffin just before the arrival of Shade and his allies, who have escaped Zotz' trap. Shade dies by suicide so that his life force can be absorbed by both Griffin and Luna, and they all enter the Tree. The newly-reborn Goth discovers the ruins of a temple to Zotz and a group of Vampyrum Spectrum, whom he begins to indoctrinate. The newly-reborn Griffin and Luna return to Tree Haven and reunite with Marina. Unbeknownst to them, Shade is present in an immaterial form and merges his spirit with those around him.

Characters

Griffin
Shade and Marina's son. Due to his mixed lineage, he's physically unique, as compared to the other Silverwing newborns; as a result, he's self-conscious and feels like an outcast. He is constantly worrying over anything & everything and his overactive imagination provides him with colorful answers to the question, 'what's the worst that can happen?'. To further his lack of confidence, Griffin fears that his father, revered as a hero among the Silverwing colony, will reject him as a coward. When he accidentally causes Luna's death, he ends up being sucked into the Underworld. During his journey through the underworld to the Tree, he gains self-confidence and faith in himself. He is killed briefly by Goth, but comes back to life when he absorbs half of Shade's life force. His name comes from the griffin, a blend between two animals: an eagle and a lion, a fitting name for a Silverwing-Brightwing hybrid.

Luna
A Silverwing newborn, and Griffin's best friend. As a contrast to Griffin's constant worrying, Luna is fearless, daring and popular among the other Silverwing newborns. She dies from her burns when Griffin, in his attempt to steal fire from Humans, drops a burning stalk of grass on her and she catches fire. Griffin meets up with her again in the Underworld and, although she doesn't recognize him at first (or realize that she's dead), Griffin convinces her to fly to the Tree with him.

After realizing she had died, Luna begins to feel constant pain from her burns. Once Griffin confesses that it was his fault she'd died, Luna lashes out and attacks, nearly killing him, but Griffin manages to make her stop and she apologizes to him. Eventually, even though the sight of the Tree frightens her (it appears to be made entirely out of fire, something that terrifies her, due to the nature of her death), she comes back to the upper world with Griffin after absorbing half of Shade's life force.  Her name is a reference to the Roman goddess of the moon.

Shade
The Bat, The Myth, The Legend. Shade Silverwing is Griffin's father and the protagonist of Silverwing and Sunwing. As a newborn, he had been mocked by his peers for his small size and lack of physical strength, but became a master of echolocation, often creating illusions or moving materials with echoes. It was this ability that allowed him to save his colony, his species and the world in one fell swoop. In Firewing, Shade comes home to Tree Haven to find that Griffin's been lost in the underworld, and he goes to follow him. Eventually reuniting with Griffin and Luna with the help of a group of Pilgrims, Shade makes it all the way to the Tree, only to die by suicide for his son's sake when Griffin is killed by Goth. His name means "darkness".

Goth
Goth is a cannibal male bat, king to the Vampyrum spectrum, and is deceptive and cunning. He was taken from his home in the jungle by Humans and sought to return home, with his whining tag-along, Throbb (who later died in a lightning storm). His carnivorous nature makes him eat many kinds of animals, enraging the owls against Shade. He was killed in Sunwing in an explosion when the high priest, Voxzaco, dropped an exploding disc, aiming to sacrifice 100 hearts within a solar eclipse. Goth is ruthless & bloodthirsty and, after being outsmarted by Shade, makes it his personal goal to kill the other bat (to the point of getting distracted from his mission to kill Griffin when he sees Shade).

Goth returns to life at the end of Firewing when he disguises himself as Shade and kills Griffin, absorbing his life and returning to the living world through the Tree. He then reappears at the temple where he was killed, meeting a group of Vampyrum bats and preaching to them about Cama Zotz. His name comes from the English word, gothic.

Notes
Firewing is the first book to feature the bat gods as actual characters. Aspects of the bat religions were mentioned in the previous two books, but there was nothing to suggest that they truly existed in the context of the Silverwing universe.
While Zotz remains imprisoned in the Underworld by the end of the novel, he has two plans in place that could free him. The first plan is Goth rebuilding Zotz' followers and having their descendants free Zotz at the next solar eclipse. The second plan is the tunnel Zotz is digging to the surface, which he claims will allow him to suck enough living creatures into the Underworld as sacrifices to empower him enough to seize control of the living.
Unlike the previous two novels in the Silverwing trilogy, Marina is not one of Firewing's main characters and appears only during the beginning of the novel and very briefly at the end.
Once Shade goes through the tree, he becomes a ghost and can go through everything, but no one can see him.

Publication history
Firewing was first released in Canada in April 2002. It was followed with its release in the United Kingdom and the United States in September 2002 and February 2003 respectively. Below is the release details for the first edition hardback and paperback copies in these three publication regions.

2002, CAN, HarperCollins , Pub date April 18, 2002, Trade paperback
2003, US, Simon & Schuster , Pub date February 1, 2003, Hardback
2002, UK, Hodder Children's Books , Pub date September 12, 2002, Paperback
2003, CAN, HarperCollins , Pub date December 18, 2003, Paperback
2004, US, Aladdin , Pub date May 4, 2004, Paperback

2002 Canadian novels
Canadian fantasy novels
Novels by Kenneth Oppel
Silverwing (series)
Children's novels about animals
Children's fantasy novels
Fiction about deicide
2002 children's books